Kranjska Gora Ski Resort is Slovenia's oldest ski resort at Kranjska Gora, Upper Carniola, opened in 1948. It is divided into five different sections under the Vitranc Mountain, streched throughout the whole valley of the same name municipality: Mojstrana, Kranjska Gora,  Planica, Podkoren 1, and Podkoren 2.

Since 1961, resort is hosting Vitranc Cup, one of the oldest and most prestigious active alpine skiing competitions in the world, and being classic regular World Cup host since 1968 season.

"Podkoren 3", which is hosting World Cup events since 1983, is the steepest and most difficult groomed ski course in Slovenia with maximum incline at 30.5° degrees (59%).

History

1948: First ski lift in Slovenia
On 29 November 1948, first ever Slovenian ski resort and lift (surface) was officially opened at "Preseka" slope. It was 960 m long and 265 m different height, with lift capacity of 170 skiers per hour.

1961: Vitranc Cup premiere
On 4–5 March 1961, first Vitranc Cup was held with men's giant slalom and slalom, both international "FIS 1A" events. Josef Stiegler (AUT) won GS and Ernst Falch (AUT) won SL next day. Start of first GS was at 1,552 metres, just under the top of Vitranc Mountain with Finish at 1,035 metres on the route of notorious "Bukovnik downhill". It was so steep, dangerous and scary, that it was too much even for the best skilled skiers in world. The whole upper slope was compared and known as "harakiri with acceleration". Even worse than Streif downhill course in Kitzbühel.

1968: World Cup debut
On 10 March 1968, Kranjska Gora hosted first World Cup event at old extra demanding and steep course above ex gas station. French skier Patrick Russel won the World Cup slalom.

1982: Record attendance
On 20 March 1982, domestic superhero Bojan Križaj took first ever World Cup victory for Slovenia in home country, winning SL by beating legendary Ingemar Stenmark, with record attendance of 32,000 people.

Until this day this is still the most attended alpine ski competition in Slovenia ever. It is part of Slovenian sport folklore and popculture, the most famous and worshiped  alpine ski event in history of Slovenia.

Ski slopes

Resort statistics

Elevation
Summit - , Base - ,

Ski Terrain

Slope Difficulty
- 2 slopes expert
- 5 slopes advanced
- 8 slopes intermediate
- 2 slopes beginner

Vertical Drop: 

Longest Run: "Velika dolina" -

Other activities
Snow Fun Park/Halfpipe 
Cross country skiing
Sledding, Bike Park, Tubing (only in summer) & hiking

Club5+ 
In 1986, elite Club5 was originally founded by prestigious classic downhill organizers: Kitzbühel, Wengen, Garmisch, Val d’Isère and Val Gardena/Gröden, with goal to bring alpine ski sport on the highest levels possible.

Later over the years other classic longterm organizers joined the now named Club5+: Alta Badia, Cortina, Kranjska Gora, Maribor, Lake Louise, Schladming, Adelboden, Kvitfjell, St.Moritz and Åre.

See also
Kranjska Gora

References

External links
 – 
Skimap.org – Kranjska Gora
FIS World Cup – podium finishers

Ski areas and resorts in Slovenia
Municipality of Kranjska Gora
1948 establishments in Yugoslavia
Sport in the Alps